is a Japanese Nippon Professional Baseball player.

External links

NPB.com

Living people
1982 births
Baseball people from Gunma Prefecture
Japanese expatriate baseball players in the United States
Nippon Professional Baseball pitchers
Orix Buffaloes players
North Shore Honu players